Helen Thompson is an English academic who teaches politics at Cambridge University, where she is a Professor of Political Economy and a fellow of Clare College, Cambridge, where she is also Director of Studies.

She has been working in Cambridge since 1994 and is currently a member of the Department of Politics and International Studies. One of her recent research interests is the aftermath of the 2008 Financial crisis.

She often co-hosted the Talking Politics podcast with David Runciman.

Selected works

References

External links
Clare College profile page
University of Cambridge profile page
 

Living people
Fellows of Clare College, Cambridge
English political scientists
Date of birth missing (living people)
Place of birth missing (living people)
Year of birth missing (living people)
Women political scientists
Professors of Political Economy (Cambridge)